Brad Hudson is an American politician serving as a member of the Missouri House of Representatives from the 138th district. Elected in November 2018, he assumed office in January 2019.

Early life and education 
Hudson was raised on a farm near Cape Fair, Missouri. He earned a Bachelor of Arts degree in biblical studies from the Midwest College of Theology in 2011.

Career 
Hudson worked as a chief compliance officer and assessor for the government Stone County, Missouri. He was elected to the Missouri House of Representatives in November 2018 and assumed office in January 2019. Hudson also serves as chair of the House Subcommittee on Appropriations – General Administration. In May 2021, Hudson was appointed to serve as a member of the Missouri Tourism Commission.

References 

Living people
Missouri Republicans
Members of the Mississippi House of Representatives
People from Stone County, Missouri
Year of birth missing (living people)